
5th Fighter Division (5. Jagd-Division) was one of the primary divisions of the German Luftwaffe in World War II. It was formed in June 1943 and subordinated to the 12th Air Corps. The Division was reorganised as 7th Fighter Division on 15 September 1943 and reformed again the same day in Paris and subordinated to the 2nd Fighter Corps. The unit was relocated to Karlsruhe-Durlach in October 1944 and subordinated to Luftwaffenkommando West. The division was redesignated to 16th Air Division on 26 January 1945.

Commanding officers
Generalleutnant Walter Schwabedissen, July 1942 – 15 September 1943
Oberst Harry von Bülow-Bothkamp, September 1943 – November 1943
Generalleutnant Joachim-Friedrich Huth, 11 November 1943 – 5 February 1944
Generalmajor Karl Hentschel, February 1944 – 26 January 1945

See also
 Luftwaffe Organisation

References

Air divisions of the Wehrmacht Luftwaffe
Military units and formations established in 1942
Military units and formations disestablished in 1945